Asahel Albert Lathrop (December 25, 1810January 23, 1893) was one of thousands of 19th-century American Mormon pioneers who is best known today for his involvement on August 6, 1838, in Gallatin Election Day Battle in Daviess County, Missouri; a voting incident involving Asahel's brother-in-law-, Samuel Brown, the husband of Lydia Marie Lathrop, which led to a full-scale war. A group of armed men forced Asahel A. Lathrop from his home, and held his wife and children prisoner; they later died.

Statement

Relations
Asahel Albert Lathrop is a direct descendant of John Lothropp (also Lothrop or Lathrop; 1584–1653) a clergyman, who was a Puritan who came to New England after imprisonment in The Clink.

Notable kin
 President of the United States Ulysses S. Grant

References

1810 births
1891 deaths